is a Japanese author of novels and light novels, and Naoki Prize winner.

Biography 
Sakuraba was born in Shimane Prefecture on the 26th of July 1971. She, however, grew up in Yonago, Tottori Prefecture.

She started writing novels when she was in the fourth or fifth grade of elementary school. In the library, Sakuraba often met a girl who she befriended that was writing something like a novel, so she decided to do the same, writing her first novel in her notebook.

During her junior and senior high school years, Sakuraba skipped classes and cram school to read books. She states that she was seemingly unable to and hated studying. She graduated from Yonago Higashi High School and moved to Tokyo for university. During university, she repeatedly tried but failed to write anything substantial. Sakuraba continued to read books however and had a part-time job.

In 1993, she won the DENiM New Writer's Award. In 1999, Sakuraba's novel Yozora ni, Manten no Hoshi (later retitled Loneliness Guardian: AD2015 Isolated Town) received an honorable mention in the 1st Famitsu Entertainment Award in the novel category. Novelist Usagi Nakamura was on the selection committee and recommended the work, barely making the selection and allowing Sakuraba to debut. After her debut, there was a period of stagnation where Sakuraba did not publish much and the work she did publish did not sell well.

In 2003, Sakuraba made her first big break with the light novel series Gosick. In addition, her novels Suitei Shōjo and A Lollypop or A Bullet published in 2004 were highly acclaimed, and in 2005, her novel Shōjo ni wa Mukanai Shokugyō attracted attention as her first work for the general public.

In 2007, she won the 60th Mystery Writers of Japan Award in the long and serial short story category for her work Red Girls: The Legend of the Akakuchibas published in 2006. The same work was nominated for the 28th Eiji Yoshikawa Literary Newcomer Award. In 2008, she won the 138th Naoki Prize for her novel Watashi no Otoko.

Works in English translation
Gosick series
 Gosick, Volume 1 (Tokyopop. 2008. )
 Gosick, Volume 2: The Crime That Has No Name (Tokyopop. 2010. )
Other novel
Red Girls: The Legend of the Akakuchibas (original title: Akakuchiba-ke no Densetsu), trans. Jocelyne Allen (Haikasoru, 2015)

Awards and nominations
Japanese Awards
 2007 – Mystery Writers of Japan Award for Best Novel: Red Girls: The Legend of the Akakuchibas
 2007 – Nominee for Yoshikawa Eiji Prize for New Writers: Red Girls: The Legend of the Akakuchibas
 2007 – Nominee for Naoki Prize: Red Girls: The Legend of the Akakuchibas
 2007 – Naoki Prize: Watashi no Otoko (My Man)

U.S. Awards
 2016 – Longlisted for the 2015 James Tiptree, Jr. Award: Red Girls: The Legend of the Akakuchibas

Bibliography

Gosick series 

Books in the GOSICK series up to GOSICKs III were published originally by Fujimi Mystery Bunko; the publishing dates listed correspond to this printing. Between September 2009 and January 2011, these books were republished by Kadokawa Bunko. From February to November 2011 they were then republished by Kadokawa Beans Bunko. Starting with GOSICK VII the books have been published by Kadokawa Bunko exclusively.

Royalties from the first edition printing of GOSICK VII were donated to the Japanese Red Cross to aid victims of the 2011 Tōhoku earthquake and tsunami.

Other light novels

Mainstream novels 
Sakuraba's mainstream novels have been released by a variety of publishers. The bulk of them have also been rereleased several years after their original publishing dates by different publishers.

Red Girls: The Legend of the Akakuchibas was the winner of the 60th Mystery Writers of Japan Award in 2007, and Watashi no Otoko (My Man) won the 138th Naoki Prize in the latter half of the same year.

Anthologized Works 
In addition to her full-length works, Sakuraba has contributed short stories to a number of literary anthologies.

Essay collections 
Aside from her works of fiction, Sakuraba has written a number of essays that have been compiled into collection. Her first essay collection, Nidaime no Baka ni Tsukeru Kusuri, was published under the masculine pen name .

TV and film adaptations 
 TV anime
 Gosick (2011)

 Anime films
 Fuse Teppō Musume no Torimonochō (2012)

 Live action films
 Girl's Blood (2014)
 My Man (2014)

External links 
 Kazuki Sakuraba Official Site (in Japanese)
 J'Lit | Authors : Kazuki Sakuraba | Books from Japan

References

Japanese women short story writers
Japanese mystery writers
Japanese crime fiction writers
Mystery Writers of Japan Award winners
Light novelists
1971 births
Living people
Women mystery writers
Japanese women novelists
20th-century Japanese novelists
21st-century Japanese novelists
20th-century Japanese women writers
21st-century Japanese women writers
20th-century Japanese short story writers
21st-century Japanese short story writers
People from Shimane Prefecture
Writers from Tottori Prefecture
People from Yonago, Tottori